Beyram District is a district (bakhsh) in Gerash County, Fars Province, Iran. At the 2006 census, its population was 12,389, in 2,671 families.  The District has one city: Beyram. The District has two rural districts (dehestan): Bala Deh Rural District and Beyram Rural District.

References 

Larestan County
Districts of Fars Province